The 1941 season of the Primera División Peruana, the top category of Peruvian football, was played by 8 teams. The national champions were Universitario. No team was relegated as First Division grew to 10 teams. From 1931 until 1942 the points system was W:3, D:2, L:1, walkover:0.

Results

Standings

External links 
 Peru 1941 season at RSSSF
 Peruvian Football League News 

Peru1
Peruvian Primera División seasons
1941 in Peruvian football